Tom Sutcliffe (2 July 1865 – 8 January 1931) was an English businessman and Conservative Party politician.

Educated at Haileybury and Oxford, Sutcliffe became head of the shipping company J. Sutcliffe and Sons.

He was elected at the 1922 general election as the Member of Parliament for Great Grimsby.
He was re-elected in 1923, but did not contest the  1924 general election.

He served as High Sheriff of Lincolnshire during the years 1929–30,
and died aged 65 on 8 January 1931 at a nursing home in Harrogate, West Riding of Yorkshire, England, .

References

External links 
 

1865 births
1931 deaths
Conservative Party (UK) MPs for English constituencies
UK MPs 1922–1923
UK MPs 1923–1924
British businesspeople in shipping
People educated at Haileybury and Imperial Service College
Alumni of Pembroke College, Oxford
High Sheriffs of Lincolnshire
Members of the Parliament of the United Kingdom for Great Grimsby